"Raindrops" is a 1961 song by American R&B singer Dee Clark, and was released in April of that same year.

Background
The ballad is about a man who tries to convince himself that the tears he is crying since his lover's departure are raindrops since "a man ain't supposed to cry."  Clark was reportedly inspired to write the song after a late night drive through a heavy rainstorm.  Accordingly, the opening and closing of the song both feature heavy rain and thunder sound effects, with the closing augmented by Clark's powerful, swooping falsetto.

Musicians on the record included Al Duncan on drums, Quinn Wilson on bass, Earl Skarritt on electric guitar and Phil Upchurch on acoustic guitar, plus a string section.  The song was recorded in a three hour session at Universal Recording Corporation in Chicago, with Bruce Swedien as engineer.

Chart performance
The song peaked at No.2 on the Hot 100, behind Quarter to Three by Gary U.S. Bonds.  On other US charts, "Raindrops" peaked at No.3 on the R&B chart. Billboard ranked it as the ninth most popular song of the year for 1961.

Cover Versions
In 1966, Jan & Dean included it on their album, Save For A Rainy Day. 
In 1974, Narvel Felts had a Top 40 country hit with his rendition.
Other artists to record the song included Tony Orlando and Dawn, David Cassidy

References

External links
 

1961 singles
Rhythm and blues songs
Vee-Jay Records singles
1961 songs
Songs about loneliness
Songs written by Dee Clark
Jan and Dean songs
Narvel Felts songs